Houseguest was a five-piece American rock band from Akron, Ohio, who recorded for Audio Eagle Records before disbanding in 2009.

The band was described by San Francisco-based literary magazine McSweeney's in 2005 as "the best pop band in America."

Albums

House Fall Down (Top Hat, 2001)
Tonight, I Have Too Many Plans
Waterworks
Up Nights (at Ghost Sites)
The Captain's Things
My Little Dinosaur
Permanent Federal Eyeball
Came Up Way Too Quick
Today It's One Year Ago
Dead of the Desert

Talking Time (Top Hat, 2004)

 Where We Left Off
 Traveller's Fancy
 Fashionable Living Room
 Be a Hero to the Tiniest of Babies
 Final Call of the Airboatman
 On Walden Software
 Greatest Gatsbees
 My Handsome Hat
 Where My Body's From
 Our Talking Times

Electric Politeness (National Syrup, 2005)

 Muted Mesa
 Galapaghost Island
 Greatest Gatsbees
 Dead of the Desert
 The Captain's Things

High Strangeness (Audio Eagle/Fat Possum, 2006; Audio Eagle, 2007)

 Fashionable Living Room
 Gone For The Season
 Dive Deep
 On Walden Software
 It's Not You (But That's Just Me)
 Are We Us?
 King of Crystal Skies
 Galapaghost Island
 Muted Mesa
 Silvereye
 Where We Left Off
 Gravy Shift
 Heliport Impressions
 Where My Body's From

Welcome, All That's Difficult (Audio Eagle, 2008)
 Iron Oar
 Proud Utility Infielder
 Over the Falls
 Medieval (Af)Faire
 Self-Eviction
 Difficulty Club
 Spiritual CPR
 Carla!
 Blizzard of Jazz
 Little Brother Nautilus
 Our Mess (restructured)
 Our Mess
 Heir of the Dawg
 Ex-Gentlemen

References

External links

 Audio Eagle Records

Musical groups established in 2000